Louis de Bourbon (October 1612 – 6 August 1669), was Duke of Mercœur and later the second Duke of Vendôme, and the grandson of Henry IV of France and Gabrielle d'Estrées. He became Duke of Vendôme in 1665, after the death of his father.

Biography
Louis was the son of César de Bourbon, Légitimé de France, Duke of Vendôme and Françoise de Lorraine (1592–1669), daughter of Philippe Emmanuel, Duke of Mercœur (d. 1602). Louis had a military career and was Governor of Provence from 1653 to 1669. After the death of his wife in 1657, he entered the church and became a cardinal and legate of France. As a cardinal, he was styled as the cardinal de Vendôme.

Marriage and issue
Louis married Laura Mancini, niece of Cardinal Mazarin, on 4 February 1651. Their children:
Louis Joseph de Bourbon (1654–1712), Duke of Vendôme and Marshal of France; married Marie Anne de Bourbon no issue;
Philippe de Bourbon (1655–1727), called le prieur de Vendôme, last Duke of Vendôme; never married; no issue. 
Jules César de Bourbon (1657–1660) died in infancy.

Ancestry

See also
Pavillon Vendôme

References

Sources

1612 births
1669 deaths
House of Bourbon-Vendôme
Dukes of Vendôme
House of Bourbon
Clergy from Paris
17th-century French cardinals
Dukes of Étampes
Dukes of Beaufort (France)
Governors of Provence
Date of birth unknown
Dukes of Mercœur